Sivakov or Sivakow  is a Slavic masculine surname, its feminine counterpart is Sivakova or Sivakowa. It may refer to
Ivan Sivakov (1901–1944), Soviet general 
Mikhail Sivakow (born 1988), Belarusian football player 
Pavel Sivakov (born 1997), Russian cyclist
Tamara Sivakova (born 1965), Belarusian Paralympic athlete